Fortunio Bonanova, pseudonym of Josep Lluís Moll, (13 January 1895 – 2 April 1969) was a Spanish baritone singer and a film, theater, and television actor. He occasionally worked as a producer and director.

According to Lluis Fàbregas Cuixart, the pseudonym Fortunio Bonanova referred to his desire to seek fortune, and his love of the Bonanova neighborhood in his native Palma.

Biography 
As a young man, living under his birthname, he was a professional telegraph operator. He studied music with the Italian Giovachini. In 1921, he debuted as a singer in Tannhäuser, at the Teatre Principal in Palma. That year, along with a group of Majorcan intellectuals and Jorge Luis Borges (who was briefly living in Majorca with his parents and sister), he signed the Ultraist Manifesto, using the name Fortunio Bonanova.

Also in 1921, he appeared in a silent film of Don Juan Tenorio by the brothers Baños, which was shown the following year in New York City and Hollywood. He later directed his own Don Juan in 1924.

In 1927, he acted in Love of Sunya, directed by Albert Parker and starring Gloria Swanson. In 1932 he had small parts in Hollywood productions featuring Joan Bennett and Mary Astor. In the same period, he appeared in New York in several operas as well as the  zarzuelas La Canción del Olvido ("The song of forgetting"), La Duquesa del Tabarín ("The Duchess of Tabarín"), Los Gavilanes, and La Montería. In 1934, he returned to Spain, where he had a major role in the film El Desaparecido ("The disappeared one") written and directed by Antonio Graciani. In 1935 he acted and sang in the film Poderoso Caballero ("A Big Guy"), directed by Màximo Nossik.

In 1936, with the outbreak of the Spanish Civil War, he returned to the United States, where he played the role of Captain Bill in a film called Capitán Tormenta, directed by Jules Bernhardt. A sequence of increasingly larger acting and singing roles mostly in English-language films followed, especially after 1940. Among his roles were Signor Matiste, Susan Alexander Kane's opera coach in Citizen Kane (1941); General Sebastiano in Five Graves to Cairo (1943); Don Miguel in The Black Swan (1942); Fernando in For Whom the Bell Tolls (1943); Sam Garlopis in Double Indemnity (1944); and a singing Christopher Columbus in Where Do We Go From Here?. He continued for the next several decades in a miscellany of character roles.

Bonanova was also an uncredited technical consultant for the film Blood and Sand (1941), and produced and appeared in the Spanish-language film La Inmaculada (a name of the Virgin Mary, "Immaculate")(1939).

Bonanova played the father of twins Esther Williams, and Ricardo Montalbán in the 1947 film Fiesta.  In 1949, Bonanova collaborated with Ambrose Barker on a musical entitled "Glamor/Glamour is the Gimmick." It got bad reviews—what may have been popular and witty when Barker developed it in the early 1930s didn’t make it in 1949.

In the 1950s, he appeared in an episode of I Love Lucy as a fake psychic who uses his stage apparatus to make it appear as though Lucy is able to speak Spanish to her mother-in-law. In 1952, he played an Italian opera singer, Anthony Branchetti, in the fourth episode of My Little Margie where Margie helps her  father by convincing Mr. Branchetti to appear at a party in his honor to impress a reluctant client of Honeywell & Todd. In 1953 he played Lou Costello's Uncle Bozzo in the Abbott & Costello episode of "Uncle Bozzo's Visit." In 1955, he portrayed an opera star in an episode of the situation comedy Willy.

Bonanova died in 1969 in Woodland Hills, California of a cerebral hemorrhage and is buried at Holy Cross Cemetery in Culver City, California.

Partial filmography

 Don Juan Tenorio (1922) - Don Juan Tenorio
 Don Juan (1924)
 Careless Lady (1932) - Rodriguez (film debut)
 A Successful Calamity (1932) - Pietro Rafaelo, the Pianist
 He Who Disappeared (1934) - Reporter
 El capitan Tormenta (1936) - Capt. Bill
 Poderoso caballero (1936)
 El carnaval del diablo (1936)
 Beg, Borrow or Steal (1937) - ISMAN (uncredited)
 Romance in the Dark (1938) - Tenor
 Tropic Holiday (1938) - Barrera
 Bulldog Drummond in Africa (1938) - African Police Corporal (uncredited)
 La Inmaculada (1939)
 I Was an Adventuress (1940) - Orchestra Leader
 Down Argentine Way (1940) - Hotel Manager
 The Mark of Zorro (1940) - Sentry (uncredited)
 That Night in Rio (1941) - Pereira
 They Met in Argentina (1941) - Pedro, Ranch Blacksmith (uncredited)
 Citizen Kane (1941) - Signor Matiste
 Blood and Sand (1941) - Pedro Espinosa 
 Moon Over Miami (1941) - Mr. Pretto
 Unfinished Business (1941) - Impresario (uncredited)
 A Yank in the R.A.F. (1941) - Louie - Headwaiter
 Two Latins from Manhattan (1941) - Armando Rivero
 Mr. and Mrs. North (1942) - Buano
 Four Jacks and a Jill (1942) - Mike - Nightclub Owner (uncredited)
 Call Out the Marines (1942) - Chef (uncredited)
 Obliging Young Lady (1942) - Chef
 Sing Your Worries Away (1942) - Gaston - Headwaiter (uncredited)
 Larceny, Inc. (1942) - Anton Copoulos
 Girl Trouble (1942) - Simon Cordoba
 The Black Swan (1942) - Don Miguel (uncredited)
 Hello, Frisco, Hello (1943) - Opera Singer (uncredited)
 Five Graves to Cairo (1943) - Gen. Sebastiano
 Dixie (1943) - Waiter
 For Whom the Bell Tolls (1943) - Fernando
 The Sultan's Daughter (1943) - Kuda
 The Song of Bernadette (1943) - Imperial Prince Louis (uncredited)
 Ali Baba and the Forty Thieves (1944) - Old Baba
 My Best Gal (1944) - Charlie
 Going My Way (1944) - Tomaso Bozanni
 Double Indemnity (1944) - Sam Garlopis
 Mrs. Parkington (1944) - Signor Cellini
 Brazil (1944) - Senor Renaldo Da Silva
 Where Do We Go from Here? (1945) - Christopher Columbus
 Mischievous Susana (1945) - Conde Mauricio Tonescu
 A Bell for Adano (1945) - Gargano - Chief of Police
 Man Alive (1945) - Prof. Zorado
 Hit the Hay (1945) - Mario Alvini
 The Red Dragon (1945) - Insp. Luis Carvero
 The Sailor Takes a Wife (1945) - Telephone Man (uncredited)
 Pepita Jiménez (1946) - Don Pedro Vargas
 Monsieur Beaucaire (1946) - Don Carlos
 Fiesta (1947) - Antonio Morales
 The Kneeling Goddess (1947) - Nacho Gutiérrez
 The Fugitive (1947) - The Governor's Cousin
 Rose of Santa Rosa (1947) - Don Manuel Ortega
 Romance on the High Seas (1948) - Plinio
 Angel on the Amazon (1948) - Sebastian Ortega
 Adventures of Don Juan (1948) - Don Serafino Lopez
 Bad Men of Tombstone (1949) - John Mingo
 Whirlpool (1950) - Feruccio di Ravallo
 Nancy Goes to Rio (1950) - Ricardo Domingos
 September Affair (1950) - Grazzi
 Havana Rose (1951) - Ambassador DeMarco
 Thunder Bay (1953) - Sheriff Antoine Chighizola
 The Moon Is Blue (1953) - Television Performer
 Die Jungfrau auf dem Dach (1953) - TV Ansager
 So This Is Love (1953) - Dr. Marafioti
 Second Chance (1953) - Mandy
 Conquest of Cochise (1953) - Mexican Minister
 New York Confidential (1955) - Senor
 Kiss Me Deadly (1955) - Carmen Trivago
 Jaguar (1956) - Francisco Servente
 An Affair to Remember (1957) - Courbet
 The Saga of Hemp Brown (1958) - Serge Bolanos
 Thunder in the Sun (1959) - Fernando Christophe
 The Running Man (1963) - Spanish Bank Manager
 La muerte silba un blues (1964) - Comisario Fenton (final film role)

Notes

References

 Catalina Aguiló & J.A. Mendiola, Fortunio Bonanova : un home de llegenda, Mallorca 1997.

Much of the material in this article comes from the corresponding article in the Catalan Wikipedia.

External links

 
  Opera singers in the movies
 Fortunio Bonanova on Cinefania
 Fortunio Bonanova on Rotten Tomatoes
 

1895 births
1969 deaths
Male film actors from Catalonia
Spanish male film actors
Singers from Catalonia
People from Palma de Mallorca
Singers from the Balearic Islands
20th-century Spanish male actors
20th-century Spanish male opera singers
Spanish expatriates in the United States
Spanish operatic baritones